The PA clan (Proteases of mixed nucleophile, superfamily A) is the largest group of proteases with common ancestry as identified by structural homology. Members have a chymotrypsin-like fold and similar proteolysis mechanisms but can have identity of <10%. The clan contains both cysteine and serine proteases (different nucleophiles). PA clan proteases can be found in plants, animals, fungi, eubacteria, archaea and viruses.

The common use of the catalytic triad for hydrolysis by multiple clans of proteases, including the PA clan, represents an example of convergent evolution. The differences in the catalytic triad within the PA clan is also an example of divergent evolution of active sites in enzymes.

History 
In the 1960s, the sequence similarity of several proteases indicated that they were evolutionarily related. These were grouped into the chymotrypsin-like serine proteases  (now called the S1 family). As the structures of these, and other proteases were solved by X-ray crystallography in the 1970s and 80s, it was noticed that several viral proteases such as Tobacco Etch Virus protease showed structural homology despite no discernible sequence similarity and even a different nucleophile. Based on structural homology, a superfamily was defined and later named the PA clan (by the MEROPS classification system). As more structures are solved, more protease families have been added to the PA clan superfamily.

Etymology
The P refers to Proteases of mixed nucleophile. The A indicates that it was the first such clan to be identified (there also exist the PB, PC, PD and PE clans).

Structure 

Despite retaining as little as 10% sequence identity, PA clan members isolated from viruses, prokaryotes and eukaryotes show structural homology and can be aligned by structural similarity (e.g. with DALI).

Double β-barrel
PA clan proteases all share a core motif of two β-barrels with covalent catalysis performed by an acid-histidine-nucleophile catalytic triad motif. The barrels are arranged perpendicularly beside each other with hydrophobic residues holding them together as the core scaffold for the enzyme. The triad residues are split between the two barrels so that catalysis takes place at their interface.

Viral protease loop
In addition to the double β-barrel core, some viral proteases (such as TEV protease) have a long, flexible C-terminal loop that forms a lid that completely covers the substrate and create a binding tunnel. This tunnel contains a set of tight binding pockets such that each side chain of the substrate peptide (P6 to P1’) is bound in a complementary site (S6 to S1’) and specificity is endowed by the large contact area between enzyme and substrate. Conversely, cellular proteases that lack this loop, such as trypsin have broader specificity.

Evolution and function

Catalytic activity 

Structural homology indicates that the PA clan members are descended from a common ancestor of the same fold. Although PA clan proteases use a catalytic triad perform 2-step nucleophilic catalysis, some families use serine as the nucleophile whereas others use cysteine. The superfamily is therefore an extreme example of divergent enzyme evolution since during evolutionary history, the core catalytic residue of the enzyme has switched in different families. In addition to their structural similarity, directed evolution has been shown to be able to convert a cysteine protease into an active serine protease. All cellular PA clan proteases are serine proteases, however there are both serine and cysteine protease families of viral proteases. The majority are endopeptidases, with the exception being the S46 family of exopeptidases.

Biological role and substrate specificity 
In addition to divergence in their core catalytic machinery, the PA clan proteases also show wide divergent evolution in function. Members of the PA clan can be found in eukaryotes, prokaryotes and viruses and encompass a wide range of functions. In mammals, some are involved in blood clotting (e.g. thrombin) and so have high substrate specificity as well as digestion (e.g. trypsin) with broad substrate specificity. Several snake venoms are also PA clan proteases, such as pit viper haemotoxin and interfere with the victim's blood clotting cascade. Additionally, bacteria such as Staphylococcus aureus secrete exfoliative toxin which digest and damage the host's tissues. Many viruses express their genome as a single, massive polyprotein and use a PA clan protease to cleave this into functional units (e.g. polio, norovirus, and TEV proteases).

There are also several pseudoenzymes in the superfamily, where the catalytic triad residues have been mutated and so function as binding proteins. For example, the heparin-binding protein Azurocidin has a glycine in place of the nucleophile and a serine in place of the histidine.

Families
Within the PA clan (P=proteases of mixed nucleophiles), families are designated by their catalytic nucleophile (C=cysteine proteases, S=serine proteases). Despite the lack of sequence homology for the PA clan as a whole, individual families within it can be identified by sequence similarity.

See also 

Protease
cysteine-
serine-
threonine-
aspartic-
metallo-
Catalytic triad
Homology (biology)
MEROPS
Protein family
Protein superfamily
Protein structure
Structural alignment

References

External links 
MEROPS - Comprehensive protease database
Superfamily - A database of protein folds

EC 3.4
Molecular evolution
Proteases
Protein superfamilies